Fort Henry is an unincorporated community in Randolph County, in the U.S. state of Missouri.

History
A post office called Fort Henry was established in 1857, and remained in operation until 1875. The name "Fort Henry" is a backwards rendering of the name of Henry Fort, a pioneer citizen. The community once had a schoolhouse, now defunct.

References

Unincorporated communities in Randolph County, Missouri
1857 establishments in Missouri
Unincorporated communities in Missouri